Lauriea is a genus of squat lobsters in the family Galatheidae, containing the following species:
 Lauriea gardineri (Laurie, 1926)
 Lauriea siagiani Baba, 1994

The genus was named in 1971 by Keiji Baba in honour of R. D. Laurie, who discovered the first species.

References

Squat lobsters